Perfect Timing may refer to:

 Perfect Timing (McAuley Schenker Group album), 1987
 Perfect Timing (Boo & Gotti album), 2003, or the title track
 Perfect Timing (Outlawz album), 2011, or the title track
 Perfect Timing (mixtape), 2017, by Nav and Metro Boomin
 "Perfect Timing (Intro)", the first track from the album
 Perfect Timing (Kiki Dee album), 1981

See also
Perfect Time, a 1998 album by Moya Brennan
"Perfect Time", a song by Roddy Ricch from Please Excuse Me for Being Antisocial